Tunnsjø senter is a village located in the Nordli area of the municipality of Lierne in Trøndelag county, Norway. It is named for its location near the large lake Tunnsjøen. It is the main village area in the far northern part of Lierne, and it is rather isolated from the rest of the municipality. To drive from this part of Lierne to the rest of Lierne, one would need to drive south about  through Sweden and back into Norway. Tunnsjø Chapel is located in the village. The village sits very close to several large lakes: Limingen and Tunnsjøen to the north, Ingelsvatnet to the west, and Kvarnbergsvattnet to the east (in Sweden).
Notable people bæstemor torhild and bæstefar ørjan.

References

Villages in Trøndelag
Lierne